Saryaydyn is a salt lake in Zhanakala District, West Kazakhstan Region, Kazakhstan.

Geography
Saryaydyn belongs to the large Kamys-Samar lake group. The lake basin is fed by snow, as well as groundwater. In the summer the lake may dry up. 

River Maly Uzen flows into Saryaydyn from the north but its water is heavily depleted by agricultural use. To the northwest lies lake Aydyn, to the north of Zhanakazan.

See also
List of lakes of Kazakhstan

References

External links

Tourism and recreational potential of the salt lakes of Western Kazakhstan

Lakes of Kazakhstan
West Kazakhstan Region
Caspian Depression